Francesco Zaza (born 1 February 1984) is an Italian equestrian athlete. He competed at the Eventing European Championships in 2007 in Pratoni del Vivaro. In 2017 he made his debut in international dressage in the Small Tour with his horse Wispering Romance, the same horse he will compete at the 2020 Olympic Games. In 2020 he won gold during the Italian Dressage Championships.

Zaza represented Italy at the Olympic Games in Tokyo, Japan, finishing 43rd in the individual competition.

References

1984 births
Living people
Italian male equestrians
Italian dressage riders
Sportspeople from Monza
Equestrians at the 2020 Summer Olympics
Olympic equestrians of Italy